Heidi Gjermundsen Broch (born 1 March 1975 in Norway) is a Norwegian actress, singer and musical artist.

Gjermundsen went to Paul McCartney's famous Liverpool Institute of Performing Arts (LIPA) in 1995-1997. In Norway, she went to the Norwegian school Teaterhøgskolen in 1997-2000.

She is most known for playing Donna, in the original Norway production of Mamma Mia! and for playing the original Diana in the Norwegian production of Next to Normal.

Theatre Work

Diana - Next to Normal (2010)
Donna - Mamma Mia! (2009)
Polly Peachum - Tolvskillingsoperaen (The Threepenny Opera) (2008)
Maria Vittoria Farnese - Which Witch (2008)
An-Magritt - An-Magritt (2007)
Edith Piaf - Piaf (2004)
Eliza - My Fair Lady (2003)

Personal life
Heidi has two kids with her husband, the Norwegian actor Nicolai Cleve Broch.

External links
Piaf
Intervju (Norwegian) (Dagbladet, 2000)

Living people
Norwegian stage actresses
1975 births
English-language singers from Norway
Norwegian women singers
Norwegian musical theatre actresses
Alumni of the Liverpool Institute for Performing Arts